was a senior retainer under the Chōsokabe clan, during the late Sengoku period of Feudal Japan.

Samurai
1563 births
1588 deaths